Jim Scott (born 1950) is a former New Zealand international lawn and indoor bowls player.

Bowls career
He won a silver medal in the fours at the 1982 Commonwealth Games in Brisbane. Two years later he won a bronze in the triples and silver in the fours at the 1984 World Outdoor Bowls Championship in Aberdeen.

He won a triples bronze medal at the Asia Pacific Bowls Championships in Suva, Fiji.
He won the 1982 singles title and 1980 fours title at the New Zealand National Bowls Championships when bowling for the Johnsonville Bowls Club.

Personal life
He was a bank official by trade.

References

New Zealand male bowls players
Commonwealth Games silver medallists for New Zealand
Bowls players at the 1982 Commonwealth Games
Commonwealth Games medallists in lawn bowls
Living people
1950 births
20th-century New Zealand people
21st-century New Zealand people
Medallists at the 1982 Commonwealth Games